The Devil and Circe (German: Teufel und Circe) is a 1921 German silent drama film directed by Adolf Gärtner and starring Sascha Gura, Eduard von Winterstein and Walter von Allwoerden. It premiered in Munich on 7 June 1921.

Cast
Sascha Gura as Circe 
Walter von Allwoerden as Der Teufel 
Margarete Kupfer as Hexe 
Eduard von Winterstein   
Heinz Erdmann

References

External links

1921 films
Films of the Weimar Republic
German silent feature films
German drama films
Films directed by Adolf Gärtner
1921 drama films
German black-and-white films
Silent drama films
1920s German films
1920s German-language films